Bit Agusi or Bit Agushi (also written Bet Agus) was an ancient Aramaean Syro-Hittite state, established by Gusi of Yakhan at the beginning of the 9th century BC. It had included the cities of Arpad, Nampigi (Nampigu) and later on Aleppo Arpad was the capital of the state-kingdom. Bit Agusi stretched from the A'zaz area in the north to Hamath in the south.

Chronology 
According to Dan'el Kahn, there were seven stages of Bit Agusi history in Northern Syria in the ninth and eighth centuries BC.

 Stage 1 (858–ca. 842 BC). Early on, Bit Agusi was apparently free of political alliances with neighbors. Arame, the second king of Bit Agusi, submitted to Assyria freely in 858 BCE, along with many other rulers of the region, including the southern Anatolia.
 Stage 2 (841–823 BC). A period of Bit Agusi subjugation to Assyria. 
 Stage 3. Around 823 BC, or maybe a little later, Bit Agusi leads a local alliance opposing Assyrian hegemony, and achieves independence.
 Stage 4. Also, soon after this time Aram-Damascus becomes supreme in the region; this lasted until some time before 805 BC. Hazael, King of Aram-Damascus was prominent.
 Stage 5 (ca. 800–754 BC). This is the time when the Kingdom of Hamath-and-Luash arose in the south, while Urartu became prominent in the north. Assyria was weaker at this time.
 Stage 6 (754–744 BC). At this time, Bit Agusi (now known as the Kingdom of Arpad) rose to prominence and probably controlled Hamath, or was in a close confederation with it. Also, the Sefire treaty was concluded at this time between Bar-Gayah, "King of KTK", and Mati-ilu, son of Attarsumki, King of Arpad.
 Stage 7 (743–740 BC). Bit Agusi is reduced to the status of an Assyrian province.

The identity of Bar-Gayah, King of KTK is not entirely clear. Land of "KTK" may have been the large confederation known at the time as "All Aram".

Nevertheless, according to Gerard Gertoux, Bar-Ga’yah, the King of KTK, was an Assyrian ruler who was not the official king but only a powerful royal co-regent based, after 856 BC, at Til Barsip, which became then the military capital of the Assyrian kingdom of Bit Adini. As Mati’-El (Mati-ilu) was a vassal of Bar-Gayah, the latter was more powerful than the king of Arpad.

Decline and fall
Arpad later became a major vassal city of the Kingdom of Urartu. In 743 BC, during the Urartu-Assyria War, the Neo-Assyrian king Tiglath-Pileser III laid siege to Arpad following the defeat of the Urartian army of Sarduri II at Samsat. But the city of Arpad did not surrender easily. It took Tiglath-Pileser three years of siege to conquer Arpad, whereupon he massacred its inhabitants and destroyed the city. Afterward Arpad served a provincial capital. The remains of Arpad's walls are still preserved in Tell Rifaat to the height of 8 meters. A coalition of princes which had been allied to the city was also defeated, including the kings of Kummuh, Quwê, Carchemish and Gurgum. Bit Agusi was never repopulated.

See also
 Atarshumki I of Bit agusi

References

Syro-Hittite states
Ancient Syria
History of Aleppo
Aramean states